Keish ( – July 11, 1916), also known as James Mason and by  the nickname Skookum Jim Mason, was a member of the Tagish First Nation in what became the Yukon Territory of Canada. He was born near Bennett Lake on what is now the British Columbia and Yukon border. He lived in Caribou Crossing, now Carcross, Yukon, Canada.

Childhood 
Keish was born around 1855 near  Lake Bennett into the Daḵl'aweidi clan of Tagish. His mother, Gus'duteen, was from Tahltan country around Telegraph Creek while his father was Kaachgaawáa, chief of the Tagish Deisheetaan. His family was involved in trade between the coastal Tlingit and the inland Tagish.  The family had two sons and six daughters who reached adulthood. The  name Keish is a Tagish word meaning "wolf".

Packing career 
In the mid-1880s, Keish worked the summers as a packer, carrying supplies from the Alaska Coast, over the passes to the Yukon River system. He earned his Skookum nickname because of his extraordinary strength: he could carry huge loads of more than 45 kilos. Skookum means "strong", "big" and "reliable" in the Chinook Jargon and regional English as used in the Pacific Northwest.

Keish assisted the government surveyor William Ogilvie in his explorations of the upper Yukon River.  He reportedly packed 70 kilos of bacon over the Chilkoot Pass for the surveyor which was more than double the regular load.

Keish met George Washington Carmack, an  American trader and prospector, while working on the Trail at Dyea.  Keish and Carmack became friends, and together with Keish's nephew Káa Goox (Dawson Charlie), formed a partnership and spent two years packing on the Chilkoot Pass.  Carmack later started a family with Keish's sister Shaaw Tláa (Kate Carmack).   In 1887, Keish helped Captain William Moore with a survey of the White Pass, a low lying pass to the east of the Chilkoot Trail.  This was later developed as an alternative route to the Klondike.

Klondike discovery 
Through Carmack, Keish became interested in prospecting, and in 1888 Carmack, Keish and Goox began prospecting together up the Yukon River.  In summer 1889,  George and Kate Carmack left Tagish to go prospecting  in the Forty Mile region.  Keish remained in Tagish, and in the early 1890s married Daakuxda.éit (Mary), a Tlingit woman.  In 1891, the couple had a daughter Saayna.aat, known also as Daisy.

Several years later, having heard no news of the Carmack family, Keish and his two nephews Koołseen (Patsy Henderson) and Káa Goox  went to search for them.  They discovered the Carmacks and their daughter at the mouth of the Klondike River.   Keish, George and Káa Goox  then set off from the fishing camp to go prospecting in the Klondike basin.  They encountered Robert Henderson, who was also prospecting for gold.  Henderson told Carmack that he knew of a promising spot to look for gold, but would not share it with Carmack's First Nations companions.  The trio were incensed and left the area. A few days later, in mid August 1896, they discovered gold on Rabbit (Bonanza) Creek when one of them found a nugget the size of a dime. Who saw the gold first is a matter of dispute. Carmack claimed that he noticed it first, but Keish and his nephew asserted that it was Keish who was the discoverer. At any rate, in September 1896 Carmack staked a double “discovery claim”, while Keish and Charlie staked claims on either side of it. Although the claim was close to the area Henderson had indicated, they chose not to inform Henderson, who thus missed out.

From 1896 to 1900, the men worked together on the claims, and between them found gold worth almost a million dollars.

Later life 
This sudden wealth drastically changed the lives of Keish and his family. Seeking to live by non-native standards, in 1898 Keish built a large, ornately furnished house in Carcross for himself and his family.   He lived there in the winters before returning each spring to the Klondike where he continued hunting, trapping and prospecting for gold.  In 1903, he  and his nephew Káa Goox made a further, but smaller discovery in the Kluane region.

In 1904, Keish sold his claims in the Klondike for $65,000.  He developed a drinking problem and as a result in 1905 created the Daisy Mason Trust, to protect his fortune against spending on alcohol or gifts to others and to provide for his daughter's education.  His marriage also suffered, and following several attempts at reconciliation, in 1905 they separated and Daakuxda.éit returned to her village on the Alaskan coast.  Their daughter remained in Keish's custody.

Keish was known for his generosity to his family and others.   When Carmack abandoned his wife Kate, and left her virtually penniless, Keish built his sister a cabin in Carcross. According to Daniel Tlen, “in 1912 he gave the largest potlatch ever held in honour of  his deceased nephew Khaa Ghooxh, Dawson Charlie."

Keish died in Whitehorse, Yukon on July 11, 1916, after a long illness.

In his will, he  left the income of the  trust to his daughter Saayna.aat (Daisy Mason) and also made legacies to his sister Kate, and his nephew Koołseen (Patsy Henderson), and two other relatives, although these legacies were never paid. When his daughter died in 1938, the income from the trust was used, as directed by Keish's will, to the benefit of needy Indigenous peoples in Yukon.  The Skookum Jim Friendship Centre in Whitehorse was built  using this trust fund.

A fictionalized version of Skookum Jim appears in the TG4 series An Klondike, portrayed by Julian Black Antelope, where he is depicted as a Hän and is killed by the fictional character Pat Galvin in 1898.

References

19th-century births
1916 deaths
19th-century First Nations people
20th-century First Nations people
Canadian gold prospectors
Gold prospectors
Klondike Gold Rush
People from Carcross, Yukon
Persons of National Historic Significance (Canada)
People of the Klondike Gold Rush
Tagish people
Tahltan people